Marriott Marquis is a hotel brand owned by Marriott International and denotes flagship, large-format hotels similar to Hyatt's Hyatt Regency brand. Notable hotels using this branding include:

New York Marriott Marquis in Times Square, New York City
Atlanta Marriott Marquis in Atlanta, Georgia
San Francisco Marriott Marquis in San Francisco, California
San Diego Marriott Marquis & Marina in San Diego, California
Washington Marriott Marquis in Washington, D.C.
Marriott Marquis Houston in Houston, Texas
Marriott Marquis Chicago in Chicago, Illinois
JW Marriott Marquis Dubai in Dubai, United Arab Emirates 
JW Marriott Marquis Miami in Miami, Florida
Bangkok Marriott Marquis Queen's Park in Bangkok, Thailand 

Marriott International brands